Ronald Monteith Maitland (January 6, 1887 – April 15, 1937) was a Canadian sailor who competed in the 1932 Summer Olympics.

In 1932 he was a crew member of the Canadian boat Santa Maria which won the silver medal in the 8 metre class.

External links
profile

1887 births
1937 deaths
Canadian male sailors (sport)
Olympic sailors of Canada
Olympic silver medalists for Canada
Sailors at the 1932 Summer Olympics – 8 Metre
Olympic medalists in sailing
Medalists at the 1932 Summer Olympics